Silwani tehsil is a tehsil in Raisen district, Madhya Pradesh, India. It is also a subdivision of the administrative and revenue division of raisen district of Madhya Pradesh. Assembly constituency is silwani.

Demographics

References 

Tehsils of Madhya Pradesh
Raisen district